Lasiommata maderakal is a butterfly in the family Nymphalidae. It is found in Ethiopia and Somaliland.

References

Lasiommata
Butterflies described in 1849
Taxa named by Félix Édouard Guérin-Méneville